Jesse Palmer (born 17 October 1996) is a former professional Australian rules footballer who played for the Port Adelaide Football Club in the Australian Football League (AFL). He was drafted by the Port Adelaide Football Club with their third selection and seventy-eighth overall in the 2014 national draft. He made his debut in the forty point loss against  in round 21, 2016 at the Adelaide Oval. He was delisted by Port Adelaide at the conclusion of the 2017 season.

References

External links

1996 births
Living people
Port Adelaide Football Club players
Preston Football Club (VFA) players
Port Adelaide Football Club players (all competitions)
Australian rules footballers from Victoria (Australia)
People educated at St Patrick's College, Ballarat